Vast or VAST may refer to:

 Vast (novel), a 1998 science fiction novel by Linda Nagata

 Vast (2011 film), a Dutch film, winner of the 2011 Golden Calf for Best Television Drama
 Vast Broadband, an American cable and internet company
 Vast Studios, a Canadian video game developer
 Fernand Vast (1886 - 1968), French cyclist

Acronyms
 VAST, an American alternative rock band
 Variable Architecture Synthesis Technology, a digital sound synthesis method for the Kurzweil K2000
 Video Ad Serving Template, a metadata format for video advertising
 Vidya Academy of Science and Technology, in Thrissur, Kerala, India
 Vietnam Academy of Science and Technology, in Hanoi
 Viewer Access Satellite Television, a satellite TV service provided by the Australian government
 Visual Analytics Science and Technology
 Voest-Alpine Services and Technologies, a unit of Siemens headquartered near Pittsburgh, Pennsylvania